A Moody Christmas is an Australian television comedy series that follows the adventures of Dan Moody, who returns home from London to spend each Christmas with his dysfunctional family.  It was created and written by Trent O'Donnell and Phil Lloyd at Jungleboys, and was directed by Trent O'Donnell. The series was produced by Andy Walker, co-produced by Phil Lloyd, and executive produced by Jason Burrows of Jungleboys and Debbie Lee of ABC Television. The six-part series was first screened on ABC1 in the lead up to Christmas in October, November, and December 2012. Shot largely in Sydney, Australia, each episode runs for half an hour, following the Moody family on Christmas Day over six years.

A second series, The Moodys, began airing on ABC on 5 February 2014. The eight-part series follows the Moody family through a year's worth of celebrations, including Australia Day, Easter, and Bridget's 40th birthday. The second series was aired in the United States on Hulu in Spring 2014.

An American version of A Moody Christmas was announced in August 2013 and the show had a put pilot commitment to air on FOX. On 21 October 2019, it was announced that the series, titled The Moodys, would premiere on 4 December 2019.

Cast
Ian Meadows as Dan Moody 
Patrick Brammall as Sean Moody
Jane Harber as Cora Benson
Danny Adcock as Kevin Moody
Tina Bursill as Maree Moody
Rachel Gordon as Bridget Quaill
Phil Lloyd as Roger Quaill
Robina Beard as Gwen Dawes
Darren Gilshenan as Terry Moody
Guy Edmonds as Hayden Roberts

Episodes

Additionally, two composition episodes, Episode 7 Composition: Parts 1-3 and Episode 8 Composition: Parts 4–6, were broadcast on ABC1 on 25 December 2012 and 26 December 2012 respectively. This was effectively an encore screening of the series, in two parts, across Christmas Day and Boxing Day 2012.

Trivia
The Moody house was at 31 Reserve St Denistone. It has since been demolished, the land subdivided and two houses built on the site.

See also

List of Australian television series
List of Australian Broadcasting Corporation programs
List of Christmas films

References

External links

2012 Australian television series debuts
2012 Australian television series endings
Australian Broadcasting Corporation original programming
Australian comedy television series
Television shows set in Sydney
Christmas television series